The Marriage of Kitty is a lost 1915 American silent comedy film directed by George Melford.

It was written by Francis de Croisset, Fred de Gresac, Cosmo Gordon Lennox and Hector Turnbull. The origin of the work was de Croisset, who wrote the French play La Passerelle in 1902, and was soon adapted to English by Lennox as The Marriage of Kitty.

The film stars Fannie Ward, Richard Morris, Jack Dean, Cleo Ridgely, and Tom Forman. The film was released on August 16, 1915, by Paramount Pictures.

Plot
The film depicts a young woman who agrees to a sham wedding with Lord Riginald Belsize because his inheritance prohibits him from marrying his girlfriend who is an actress. Belsize is convinced if he marries someone else and hires that woman to be his "wife" he can hide his relationship with his girlfriend. Eventually the young woman and the Lord fall in love even though that wasn't the original intention of either of them and she reveals that his girlfriend is a dangerous woman.

Cast
Fannie Ward as Katherine "Kitty" Silverton
Richard Morris as John Travers
Jack Dean as Lord Reginald Belsize
Cleo Ridgely as Helen de Semiano
Tom Forman as Jack Churchill
Mrs. Lewis McCord as Annie
Lucien Littlefield (Undetermined Role)
Theodore Roberts (Undetermined Role)

See also
Afraid to Love (1927)

References

External links

1910s English-language films
Silent American comedy films
1915 comedy films
Paramount Pictures films
Films directed by George Melford
American black-and-white films
American films based on plays
Films based on works by Francis de Croisset
Lost American films
American silent feature films
1915 lost films
Lost comedy films
1910s American films